Valentine Dumont (born 2 July 2000) is a Belgian swimmer. She competed in the women's 200 metre freestyle at the 2019 World Aquatics Championships. In 2017, she won the silver medal in the girls' 200 metre freestyle at the 2017 European Junior Swimming Championships held in Netanya, Israel.

References

External links
 

2000 births
Living people
Place of birth missing (living people)
Belgian female freestyle swimmers
21st-century Belgian women